The sale of UK gold reserves was a policy pursued by HM Treasury over the period between 1999 and 2002, when gold prices were at their lowest in 20 years, following an extended bear market. The period itself has been dubbed by some commentators as the Brown Bottom or Brown's Bottom.

The period takes its name from Gordon Brown, the Chancellor of the Exchequer, who decided to sell approximately half of the UK's gold reserves in a series of auctions.  At the time, the UK's gold reserves were worth about US$6.5 billion, accounting for about half of the UK's US$13 billion foreign currency net reserves. There are various later estimates of the cost of that the decision to British taxpayers, for example £2 billion (The Sunday Times, 2007) and £7 billion (The Daily Telegraph, 2010).

Events
The UK government's intention to sell gold and reinvest the proceeds in foreign currency deposits, including euros, was announced on 7 May 1999, when the price of gold stood at US$282.40 per ounce (cf. the price in 1980: $850/oz ) The official stated reason for this sale was to diversify the assets of the UK's reserves away from gold, which was deemed to be too volatile. The gold sales funded a like-for-like purchase of financial instruments in different currencies. Studies performed by HM Treasury had shown that the overall volatility of the UK's reserves could be reduced by 20% from the sale.

The advance notice of the substantial sales drove the price of gold down by 10% by the time of the first auction on 6 July 1999. With many gold traders shorting, gold reached a low point of US$252.80 on 20 July.

This triggered a sharp rise in the price of gold, from around US$260 per ounce to around $330 per ounce in two weeks, before the price fell away again into 2000 and early 2001. The Central Bank Gold Agreement was renewed in 2004 and 2009.

Analysis
Brown's actions have attracted considerable criticism, particularly concerning his timing, his decision to announce the move in advance, and the use of an auction. The decision to sell gold at the low point in the price cycle has been likened by Quentin Letts to the mistakes in 1992 that led to Black Wednesday, when the UK was forced to withdraw from the European Exchange Rate Mechanism, which HM Treasury has estimated cost the UK taxpayer around £3.3 billion.

It has also been argued that the sale of the gold reserves was a positive decision in that gold had been historically under-performing and was paying no dividends to the Exchequer and the sale enabled the UK Government to pay off a substantial part of the national debt and keep repayment interest rates down on the remainder.

See also
Gold as an investment

References

Economic history of the United Kingdom
Gold investments
1999 in the United Kingdom
2000s in the United Kingdom
1999 in economics
2000s economic history
Gordon Brown
Gold in the United Kingdom
Political scandals in the United Kingdom
Economic policy in Europe
1999 scandals
Financial scandals
Monetary policy